Sir Edmund Russborough Turton, 1st Baronet, JP, DL (1 November 1857 – 8 May 1929) was a British Conservative Party politician.

Life
He was the eldest child of Edmund Henry Turton of the 3rd Dragoon Guards and his wife Lady Cecilia Mary Leeson, 2nd daughter of Joseph Leeson, 4th Earl of Milltown. He was educated at Eton College, and matriculated at Brasenose College, Oxford in 1876. He was called to the bar at the Inner Temple in 1882.

Turton was an unsuccessful candidate in the Richmond division of the North Riding of Yorkshire at the 1892 and 1895 elections. He finally entered the House of Commons twenty years later, in 1915, when he was elected as the Member of Parliament (MP) for the Thirsk & Malton division.  His predecessor had inherited a peerage, and Turton was returned unopposed at the resulting by-election.

He was appointed Chairman of the North Riding Quarter Sessions in 1898, a position that he held until at least 1926. He was a Member of the Speaker's Conference on Electoral Reform 1916–17; the Royal Commission on London Government, 1921–23; and of the Royal Commission on Local Government, 1923–25.

He held the seat until his death at the age of 71, three weeks before the 1929 general election, when a relative, Robin Turton, was elected to succeed him.

Family

Turton married in 1888 Clementina, daughter of Spencer Ponsonby-Fane. In 1926 he was created a baronet, of Upsall in the County of York. He left no heir. The title became extinct on his death.

References

External links 
 

1857 births
1929 deaths
Baronets in the Baronetage of the United Kingdom
Members of the Parliament of the United Kingdom for English constituencies
UK MPs 1910–1918
UK MPs 1918–1922
UK MPs 1922–1923
UK MPs 1923–1924
UK MPs 1924–1929
Members of London County Council
Progressive Party (London) politicians